Frederick George Bromberg (June 19, 1837 – September 4, 1930) was an American educator, lawyer, and politician who served one term as a U.S. Representative from Alabama from 1873 to 1875.

Biography 
Born in New York City, Bromberg moved with his parents to Mobile, Alabama, in February 1838. He attended the public schools and graduated from Harvard University in 1858. He then studied chemistry at Harvard from 1861 to 1863, and was a tutor of mathematics there from 1863 to 1865.

Political career 
He was appointed treasurer of the city of Mobile in July 1867 by Maj. Gen. John Pope, who commanded the department, and served until January 19, 1869. He served as a member of the Alabama State Senate 1868–1872. He was appointed postmaster of Mobile in July 1869 but was removed in June 1871. He served as chairman of the Alabama delegation to the Liberal Republican Convention at Cincinnati in 1872 (the party's only national convention).

Congress 
Bromberg was elected as a Liberal Republican and Democratic Party fusion candidate to the Forty-third Congress (March 4, 1873 – March 3, 1875), largely due to a split in the main Republican vote, defeating Philip Joseph due to the main Republican Party splitting into various factions.  Bromberg received 43.59% of the vote in the election.

He unsuccessfully ran against Jeremiah Haralson in 1874. In this race, he actually got 46% of the vote, but without a three-way race, he lost. He contested the results of the election before Congress but they accepted the results as valid.

Later career 
He studied law, was admitted to the bar in 1877 and commenced practice in Mobile, Alabama. He served as president of the State bar association in 1906.

Bromberg served as the Alabama commissioner of the World's Columbian Exposition at Chicago in 1893.

Death and burial 
He died in Mobile, Alabama, on September 4, 1930, and was interred in Magnolia Cemetery.

See also
1872 United States presidential election

Notes

References

1837 births
1930 deaths
Members of the United States House of Representatives from Alabama
Harvard University alumni
Alabama Liberal Republicans
Alabama Democrats
Liberal Republican Party members of the United States House of Representatives